The season 1996–97 of Segunda División B of Spanish football started August 1996 and ended May 1997.

Summary before the 1996–97 season 
Playoffs de Ascenso:

 Las Palmas (P) 
 Racing de Ferrol 
 Ourense (P) 
 Atlético Madrid B (P) 
 Sporting de Gijón B 
 Osasuna B
 Real Avilés Industrial 
 Cultural Leonesa
 Levante (P) 
 Gimnàstic de Tarragona
 Figueres
 Valencia B
 Jaén 
 Granada 
 Elche
 Córdoba

Relegated from Segunda División:

 Sestao Sport (dissolved)
 Athletic Bilbao B
 Getafe
 Marbella

Promoted from Tercera División:

 Celta de Vigo B (from Group 1)
 Real Oviedo B (from Group 2)
 Marino de Luanco (from Group 2)
 Gimnástica de Torrelavega (from Group 3)
 Zalla (from Group 4)
 Gernika (from Group 4)
 Llíria (from Group 6)
 Gandía (from Group 6)
 Carabanchel (from Group 7)
 Ejido (from Group 9)
 Guadix (from Group 9)
 Realejos (from Group 12)
 Murcia (from Group 13)
 Mar Menor (from Group 13)
 Cacereño (from Group 14)
 Zaragoza B (from Group 16)
 Manchego (from Group 17)

Relegated:

 San Sebastián de los Reyes
 Tenerife B
 Móstoles
 Santa Ana
 Tudelano
 Durango
 Palencia
 Amurrio
 Alcoyano
 Ontinyent
 Barcelona C
 Andorra
 Mármol Macael
 Novelda
 Lorca
 Utrera
 Leganés B

Occupied the vacant spots by Sestao Sport dissolution:
 Zamudio (occupied the vacant spot of Sestao Sport)

Group I
Teams from Asturias, Balearic Islands, Castilla–La Mancha, Community of Madrid and Galicia.

Teams

League table

Results

Top goalscorers

Top goalkeepers

Group II
Teams from Aragon, Basque Country, Cantabria, Castile and León, La Rioja and Navarre.

Teams

League Table

Results

Top goalscorers

Top goalkeepers

Group III
Teams from Andorra, Catalonia, Region of Murcia and Valencian Community.

Teams

League Table

Results

Top goalscorers

Top goalkeepers

Group IV
Teams from Andalusia, Canary Islands, Extremadura and Melilla.

Teams

League Table

Results

Top goalscorers

Top goalkeepers

Play-offs

Group A

Group B

Group C

Group D

Play-out

Semifinal

Final

Notes

External links
Futbolme.com

 
Segunda División B seasons
3

Spain